Angus Cottrell (born 20 November 1989) is an Australian former professional rugby union player. His playing position is flanker. He currently plays for the LA Giltinis of Major League Rugby (MLR).

He previously represented the Melbourne Rebels in Super Rugby.

Early life
Cottrell was born in Brisbane, Australia and attended Brisbane Boys' College. His father, Nev Cottrell Jr, played representative rugby for Queensland in the late 1970s. His grandfather, Nev "Notchy" Cottrell, captained the Wallabies playing at hooker for two Tests against the British and Irish Lions in 1950.

Cottrell currently studies a Bachelor of Property and Real Estate/Bachelor of Commerce at Deakin University.

Career
In 2011, while playing for West Brisbane Bulldogs in Queensland Premier Rugby, Cottrell was recruited by Super Rugby franchise the Western Force. He made his debut in Week 1 of the 2012 Super Rugby season against the Brumbies in Canberra.

Cottrell signed for the Melbourne Rebels for the 2018 Super Rugby season after failing to make the field for the Force during 2017 due to injury. After being tipped for an international debut by media during 2018, Cottrell was called into the Wallabies during the 2018 Rugby Championship as injury cover for Lukhan Tui.

Cottrell played two seasons for the LA Giltinis and was considered among the best forwards in Major League Rugby, playing a critical role in LA’s successful 2021 title run. He announced his retirement from professional rugby in October 2022.

Super Rugby statistics

References

External links 
Western Force profile

1989 births
Australian rugby union players
Western Force players
Perth Spirit players
Rugby union flankers
Rugby union players from Brisbane
Living people
People educated at Brisbane Boys' College
Melbourne Rebels players
Melbourne Rising players
Expatriate rugby union players in the United States
Australian expatriate rugby union players
Rugby union number eights
LA Giltinis players